Michael Anthony Nevin (born 6 May 1998) is an Irish amateur boxer.

Early life

Nevin is a native of County Laois, and a cousin of Olympic medallist John Joe Nevin.

Career

Nevin boxes at Portlaoise Boxing Club.

Nevin won bronze at the 2019 European Games in Minsk.

Notes

References

Living people
1998 births
Sportspeople from County Laois
Irish male boxers
European Games bronze medalists for Ireland
European Games medalists in boxing
Boxers at the 2019 European Games
Middleweight boxers
Southpaw boxers